Houshang Kargarnejad  (born 23 April 1945) is a retired Iranian heavyweight weightlifter who competed at the 1976 Summer Olympics. He won gold medals at the 1974 Asian Games and 1971 and 1977 Asian Championships.

References

1945 births
Living people
Iranian male weightlifters
Olympic weightlifters of Iran
Weightlifters at the 1976 Summer Olympics
Medalists at the 1970 Asian Games
Medalists at the 1974 Asian Games
Asian Games gold medalists for Iran
Asian Games bronze medalists for Iran
Weightlifters at the 1970 Asian Games
Weightlifters at the 1974 Asian Games
Asian Games medalists in weightlifting
20th-century Iranian people